The 2012 Büschl Open was a professional tennis tournament played on indoor carpet courts. It was the seventh edition of the tournament which was part of the 2012 ITF Women's Circuit. It took place in Ismaning, Germany on 22–28 October 2012.

WTA entrants

Seeds 

 1 Rankings are as of 15 October 2012.

Other entrants 
The following players received wildcards into the singles main draw:
  Anna-Lena Friedsam
  Antonia Lottner
  Carina Witthöft
  Anna Zaja

The following players received entry from the qualifying draw:
  Sandra Záhlavová
  Lyudmyla Kichenok
  Nadiia Kichenok
  Amra Sadiković

The following player received entry by a Junior Exempt:
  Irina Khromacheva

Champions

Singles 

  Annika Beck def.  Eva Birnerová, 6–3, 7–6(10–8)

Doubles 

  Romina Oprandi /  Amra Sadiković def.  Jill Craybas /  Eva Hrdinová, 4–6, 6–3, [10–7]

External links 
 2012 Büschl Open at ITFTennis.com
 

Buschl Open
Ismaning Open
2012 in German tennis